The Association to Save Yugra (or Save Yugra) is an indigenous-rights organisation of the Khanty, Mansi and Nenets people, Ugrian and Samoyedic nomadic cultures of Russian Siberia. The organisation was founded in 1989 to protect their traditional lands against extractive industries such as oil, gas, and logging. The organisation held its first congress in August 1989, and took a stance opposing logging in their forests.

The organisation is named for Yugra, the traditional homeland of the Finno-Ugric peoples, in what is now Northern Russia.

See also
Yamal to Its Descendants

References

Khanty
Khanty-Mansi Autonomous Okrug
Finno-Ugric peoples
Mansi
Nenets people
Indigenous rights organizations in Asia
Indigenous rights organizations in Europe
Politics of Siberia
Human rights organizations based in Russia
Indigenous peoples of North Asia